The following is a list of notable events and releases that happened in 2016 in music in South Korea.

Debuting and disbanded in 2016

Debuting groups

 AOA Cream
 Astro
 Blackpink
 Bolbbalgan4
 Boys24
 BtoB Blue
 CocoSori
 Double S 301
 Exo-CBX
 Gugudan
 I.B.I
 Imfact
 I.O.I
 KNK
 Masc
 MOBB
 Momoland
 NCT Dream
 NCT 127
 Nine Muses A
 Off On Off
 Pentagon
 SF9
 The East Light
 Unnies
 Victon
 Voisper
 Vromance
 WJSN

Solo debuts

 Bobby
 Dean
 Elo
 Eunji
 Fei
 Gemma
 Gun
 Hash Swan
 Hyoyeon
 Jang Dong-woo
 Jessica Jung
 Jenyer
 Jimin
 Jungah
 Jung Seung-hwan
 Justhis
 Jvcki Wai
 Kim Se-jeong 
 Kwak Jin-eon
 Kwon Jin-ah
 Lee Hyun-woo
 Luna
 Mino
 Mint
 PH-1
 Punchnello
 Ryeowook
 Sam Kim
 Sandeul
 Subin
 Thunder
 Tiffany
 Yesung
 Yezi
 Yoochun
 Woohyun
 Agust D

Disbanded groups

 2NE1
 2Yoon
 4Minute
 4L
 Eastern Sidekick
 GI
 HeartB
 Kara
 Led Apple
 LPG
 Lucky J
 MyB
 N-Sonic
 Orange Caramel
 Rainbow
 Rainbow Blaxx
 Rainbow Pixie
 Speed
 Sunny Days

Releases in 2016

First quarter

January

February

March

Second quarter

April

May

June

Third quarter

July

August

September

Fourth quarter

October

November

December

See also 
 2016 in South Korea
 List of South Korean films of 2016

References 

 
South Korean music
K-pop